Lockne is a meteorite crater, located approximately  south of the city of Östersund in northern Sweden.

The crater is exposed at the surface. Its fossils, typical of shallow marine environments, show it to be a marine target impact event.

References 

Impact craters of Sweden
Ordovician impact craters
Ordovician Sweden
Sandbian
Landforms of Jämtland County